Clown goby may refer to:

Gobiodon, a genus of gobies also known as coral gobies
, a species of goby native to the Pacific and Atlantic coasts of the Americas
Sicyopterus griseus, a species of goby endemic to India and Sri Lanka